Holck may refer to
Anne Holck, a 17th-century Danish noble
Conrad Holck, an 18th-century Danish nobleman and courtier
Eiler Holck, a 17th-century Danish military officer
Heinrich Holk, also spelled Henrik Holck, a 17th-century Danish-German mercenary
Henning Holck-Larsen, a 20th-century Danish engineer
Niels Holck, a Danish activist
Ole Elias Holck, a Norwegian military officer and representative at the Norwegian Constitutional Assembly in 1814
Oluf Holck, a Norwegian politician